The 12th Trampoline World Championships were held in Bozeman, Montana, United States on May 13–15, 1982.

Results

Men

Trampoline

Trampoline Team

Trampoline Synchro

Double Mini Trampoline

Double Mini Trampoline Team

Tumbling

Tumbling Team

Women

Trampoline

Trampoline Team

Trampoline Synchro

Double Mini Trampoline

Double Mini Trampoline Team

Tumbling

Tumbling Team

References
 Trampoline UK

Trampoline World Championships
Trampoline Gymnastics World Championships
1982 in American sports
International gymnastics competitions hosted by the United States
May 1982 sports events in the United States